The 2021 Goodyear Touring Car Trophy was the third season of the Touring Car Trophy. The championship features production-based touring cars built to either NGTC, TCR or Super 2000 specifications and will compete in fourteen races across seven meetings across England. The championship is aimed as a feeder category to the BTCC and operated by Stewart Lines' Maximum Group.

Calendar 
A new calendar was announced on 2 April 2021 with 12 rounds scheduled.

Teams and drivers

Race calendar and results

Championship standings

Drivers' Standings

References

External links
 

TCR
Touring Car Trophy
Touring Car Trophy